John Ignatius Jenkins, C.S.C. (born December 17, 1953) is a Catholic priest of the Congregation of the Holy Cross and the current president of the University of Notre Dame in Indiana. He previously served as its vice-president and associate provost. He replaced Edward Malloy as president.

He was chosen as president-elect by the Notre Dame board of trustees on April 29, 2004; his tenure began on July 1, 2005. On October 11, 2019, Jenkins was elected to a fourth consecutive five-year term as president.

Early life and career 
Jenkins was born and raised in Omaha, Nebraska, and attended Creighton Preparatory School. Jenkins earned bachelor's and master's degrees in philosophy from the University of Notre Dame in 1976 and 1978, respectively, and was ordained a priest of the Congregation of Holy Cross in the Basilica of the Sacred Heart on campus in 1983. While earning master's and doctoral degrees in philosophy from Oxford University in 1987 and 1989, respectively, he also taught in Notre Dame's London Undergraduate Program. He earned a master of divinity degree and licentiate in sacred theology from the Jesuit School of Theology at Berkeley in 1988.

Jenkins has been a member of the Notre Dame philosophy faculty since 1990; he received a Lilly Teaching Fellowship in 1991–1992. He served as director of the Old College program for Holy Cross seminarians from 1991 to 1993 and as religious superior of the Holy Cross priests and brothers at Notre Dame from 1997 to 2000. He is the author of numerous scholarly articles published in The Journal of Philosophy, Medieval Philosophy and Theology, and The Journal of Religious Ethics and of the book Knowledge and Faith in Thomas Aquinas.

Jenkins is a member of the Board of Directors for the Commission on Presidential Debates.

Notre Dame presidency 

At Jenkins’ inauguration on September 23, 2005, he stated: "My presidency will be driven by a wholehearted commitment to uniting and integrating... academic excellence and religious faith." In his inaugural address, Jenkins described his goals of making the university a leader in research that recognizes ethics and builds the connection between faith and studies. During his tenure, Notre Dame has increased its endowment, enlarged its student body, and underwent many construction projects on campus, including Compton Family Ice Arena, a new architecture hall, additional residence halls, the Jenkins-Nanovic Hall, and Campus Crossroads, a $400 million enhancement and expansion of Notre Dame Stadium.

Jenkins' decision to include an invitation to President Barack Obama to deliver the 2009 commencement address at Notre Dame and to receive an honorary degree was controversial. Inviting the sitting president of the United States to speak at commencement is, however, a custom at the University of Notre Dame. A number of Catholic bishops, including John Michael D'Arcy, the bishop of Fort Wayne–South Bend, as well as anti-abortion groups, criticized the invitation because of Obama's stance on abortion. In 2016, Kevin C. Rhoades, the bishop of Fort Wayne-South Bend, said that he disagreed with Notre Dame's decision to honor Vice President Joe Biden and John Boehner, the former speaker of the U.S. House of Representatives, with the university's Laetare Medal; Rhoades said he would have preferred the university to invite Biden and Boehner to speak "rather than bestow an honor that can provoke scandal." In 2018, Rhoades issued a statement saying, "I strongly disagree with Notre Dame’s decision to provide funding for contraception in its health insurance plans."

Jenkins has also been criticized for other decisions such as allowing performances of The Vagina Monologues and showings of gay films on campus.

As a member of the Holy Cross order, Jenkins is bound by a vow of poverty and like his predecessors is not paid a salary. The salary that is allocated for the president of the university, is given instead to the Holy Cross Order.

Salary 
As a member of the Holy Cross order, Jenkins is bound by a vow of poverty. There is, however, still a presidential salary paid to Jenkins, according to an Internal Revenue Service Form 990, which is filled out by most non-profits such as private universities. In 2014, this salary was $830,119, making Jenkins officially the highest paid university president in the state of Indiana. To put this figure in perspective, it is more than double the official salary of the president of the United States.

COVID-19

On September 26, 2020, Jenkins attended the White House Supreme Court nomination ceremony for Notre Dame professor judge Amy Coney Barrett. Pictures showed him not wearing a mask and in close physical proximity, even hugging other attendees. On October 2, 2020, Jenkins tested positive for COVID-19, joining  Trump, Melania Trump, U.S. senators Mike Lee and Thom Tillis, former New Jersey governor Chris Christie and Kellyanne Conway, all who attended the ceremony maskless. Days before the diagnosis, after photos were published, Jenkins publicly apologized for not wearing a mask nor adhering to social distancing guidelines.

On October 8, 2020, a faculty senate motion to consider a vote of no confidence was postponed by a 21 to 20 vote and after a raucous debate so that more feedback could be gathered. Jenkins was also criticized by the faculty for not following the strict health policy he imposed on campus while in Washington, for traveling while he has forbidden them and students to, and for opening Notre Dame's reputation to political exploitation.

A student-authored petition that called upon Jenkins to resign gathered 213 signatures—a number equal to approximately 2.5% of the size of Notre Dame's undergraduate student body. On October 1, 2020, one month after Jenkins tested positive for COVID-19, the majority of Notre Dame's undergraduate student senate voted in opposition to the petition. In arguing against the petition, many members of the student senate said that the motion was too extreme and that only a very small fraction of Notre Dame's undergraduate students had actually signed the petition calling for Jenkins' resignation.

References

External links

 University of Notre Dame biography

1953 births
Living people
Presidents of the University of Notre Dame
University of Notre Dame faculty
University of Notre Dame alumni
Alumni of the University of Oxford
Jesuit School of Theology at Berkeley alumni
Clergy from Omaha, Nebraska
American Roman Catholic priests
University of Notre Dame fellows
Congregation of Holy Cross
University of Notre Dame Trustees